Janaki Devi Ram is a Nepalese politician currently serving as a Member of Parliament for the House of Representatives. She is a member of the CPN (Unified Marxist–Leninist) and was elected to the parliament from the party list under the Dalit quota as a replacement for former MP Sanu Siva Pahadi who had died on 14 October 2020.

References 

21st-century Nepalese women politicians
21st-century Nepalese politicians
Nepal MPs 2017–2022
Communist Party of Nepal (Unified Marxist–Leninist) politicians

1955 births
Living people